Maasai Mara, also sometimes spelled Masai Mara and locally known simply as The Mara, is a large national game reserve in Narok, Kenya, contiguous with the Serengeti National Park in Tanzania. It is named in honor of the Maasai people, the ancestral inhabitants of the area, who migrated to the area from the Nile Basin. Their description of the area when looked at from afar: "Mara" means "spotted" in the local Maasai language, due to the many short bushy trees which dot the landscape.

Maasai Mara is one of the most famous and important wildlife conservation and wilderness areas in Africa, world-renowned for its exceptional populations of lion, leopard, cheetah and African bush elephant. It also hosts the Great Migration, which secured it as one of the Seven Natural Wonders of Africa, and as one of the ten Wonders of the World.

The Greater Mara ecosystem encompasses areas known as the Maasai Mara National Reserve, the Mara Triangle, and several Maasai Conservancies, including Koiyaki, Lemek, Ol Chorro Oirowua, Mara North, Olkinyei, Siana, Maji Moto, Naikara, Ol Derkesi, Kerinkani, Oloirien, and Kimintet.

History
When it was originally established in 1961 as a wildlife sanctuary the Mara covered only  of the current area, including the Mara Triangle. The area was extended to the east in 1961 to cover  and converted to a Game Reserve. The Narok County Council (NCC) took over management of the reserve at this time.

In 1994, the TransMara County Council (TMCC) was formed in the western part of the reserve, and control was divided between the new council and the existing Narok County Council. In May 2001, the not-for-profit Mara Conservancy took over management of the Mara Triangle which covers the western part of the reserve.

The Maasai people make up a community that spans across northern, central and southern Kenya and northern parts of Tanzania. As pastoralists, the community holds the belief that they own all of the cattle in the world. The Maasai rely off of their lands to sustain their cattle, as well as themselves and their families. Prior to the establishment of the reserve as a protected area for the conservation of wildlife and wilderness, the Maasai were forced to move out of their native lands.

Tradition continues to play a major role in the lives of modern-day Maasai people, who are known for their tall stature, patterned shukas and beadwork. It is estimated that there are approximately half a million individuals that speak the Maa language and this number includes not only the Maasai but also Samburu and Camus people in Kenya.

Geography

The total area under conservation in the Greater Maasai Mara ecosystem amounts to almost . It is bounded by the Serengeti Park to the south, the Siria / Oloololo escarpment to the west, and Maasai pastoral ranches to the north, east and west. Rainfall in the ecosystem increases markedly along a southeast–northwest gradient, varies in space and time, and is markedly bimodal. The Sand, Talek River and Mara River are the major rivers draining the reserve. Shrubs and trees fringe most drainage lines and cover hillslopes and hilltops.

The terrain of the reserve is primarily open grassland with seasonal riverlets. In the south-east region are clumps of the distinctive acacia tree. Wildlife tends to be most concentrated here, as the swampy ground means that access to water is always good, while tourist disruption is minimal.

It has a semi-arid climate with biannual rains and two distinct rainy seasons. Local farmers have referred to these as the 'long rains' which last approximately six to eight weeks in April and May and the 'short rains' in November and December which last approximately four weeks.

Elevation: ;
Rainfall: /month;
Temperature range:

Wildlife

Blue wildebeest, topi, plains zebra and Thomson's gazelle migrate into and occupy the Mara reserve, from the Serengeti plains to the south and Loita Plains in the pastoral ranches to the north-east, from July to October or later. Herds of all three species are also resident in the reserve.

 "Big Five" – lion, African leopard, African bush elephant, African buffalo, black and white rhinos – are found here all year round. The population of black rhinos was fairly numerous until 1960, but it was severely depleted by poaching in the 1970s and early 1980s, dropping to a low of 15 individuals. Numbers have been slowly increasing, but the population was still only up to an estimated 23 in 1999. The Maasai Mara is the only protected area in Kenya with an indigenous black rhino population, unaffected by translocations, and due to its size, is able to support one of the largest populations in Africa.

Hippopotamuses and Nile crocodiles are found in large groups in the Mara and Talek rivers. The plains between the Mara River and the Esoit Siria Escarpment are probably the best area for game viewing, in particular regarding lion and cheetah.

There are many large carnivores found here in the reserve. Lions are the most dominant and are found here in large numbers. Spotted hyenas are another abundant carnivore, and will often compete with lions for food. Leopards are found anywhere in the reserve where there are trees for them to escape to. East African cheetahs are also found in high numbers on the open savanna, hunting gazelles and wildebeest. African wild dogs are quite rare here due to the widespread transmission of diseases like canine distemper and the heavy competition they face with lions, who can often decimate their populations. Their packs also roam around a lot and travel far distances throughout the plains, making it hard to track them. Smaller carnivores that don't directly compete with the latter include African wolves, black-backed jackals, African striped weasels, caracals, servals, honey badgers, aardwolves, African wildcats, side-striped jackals, bat-eared foxes,  Striped polecats, African civets, genets, several mongoose species, and African clawless otters.

Wildebeest are the dominant inhabitants of the Maasai Mara, and their numbers are estimated in the millions. Around July of each year, these animals migrate north from the Serengeti plains in search of fresh pasture, and return to the south around October. The Great Migration is one of the most impressive natural events worldwide, involving some 1,300,000 blue wildebeest, 500,000 Thomson's gazelles, 97,000 topi, 18,000 common elands, and 200,000 Grant's zebras.

Antelopes can be found, including Grant's gazelles, impalas, duikers and Coke's hartebeests. The plains are also home to the distinctive Masai giraffe. The large roan antelope and the nocturnal bat-eared fox, rarely present elsewhere in Kenya, can be seen within the reserve borders.

More than 470 species of birds have been identified in the park, many of which are migrants, with almost 60 species being raptors. Birds that call this area home for at least part of the year include: vultures, marabou storks, secretary birds, hornbills, crowned cranes, ostriches, long-crested eagles, African pygmy-falcons and the lilac-breasted roller, which is the national bird of Kenya.

Administration
The Maasai Mara is administered by the Narok County government. The more visited eastern part of the park known as the Maasai Mara National Reserve is managed by the Narok County Council. The Mara Triangle in the western part is managed by the Trans-Mara county council, which has contracted management to the Mara Conservancy since the early 2000s.

The outer areas are conservancies that are administered by Group Ranch Trusts of the Maasai community, although this approach has been criticised for benefitting just a few powerful individuals rather than the majority of landowners. Although there has been a rise in fencing on private land in recent years, the wildlife roam freely across both the reserve and conservancies.

Research
The Maasai Mara is a major research centre for the spotted hyena. With two field offices in the Mara, the Michigan State University based Kay E. Holekamp Lab studies the behaviour and physiology of this predator, as well as doing comparison studies between large predators in the Mara Triangle and their counterparts in the eastern part of the Mara.

A flow assessment and trans-boundary river basin management plan between Kenya and Tanzania was completed for the river to sustain the ecosystem and the basic needs of 1 million people who depend on its water.

The Mara Predator Project also operates in the Maasai Mara, cataloging and monitoring lion populations throughout the region. Concentrating on the northern conservancies where communities coexist with wildlife, the project aims to identify population trends and responses to changes in land management, human settlements, livestock movements and tourism.

Since October 2012, the Mara-Meru Cheetah Project has worked in the Mara monitoring cheetah population, estimating population status and dynamics, and evaluating the predator impact and human activity on cheetah behavior and survival. The head of the Project, Elena Chelysheva, was working in 2001–2002 as Assistant Researcher at the Kenya Wildlife Service (KWS) Maasai-Mara Cheetah Conservation Project. At that time, she developed original method of cheetah identification based on visual analysis of the unique spot patterns on front limbs (from toes to shoulder) and hind limbs (from toes to the hip), and spots and rings on the tail. Collected over the years, photographic data allows the project team to trace kinship between generations and build Mara cheetah pedigree. The data collected helps to reveal parental relationship between individuals, survival rate of cubs, cheetah lifespan and personal reproductive history.

Tourism

The Maasai Mara is one of the most famous safari destinations in Africa. Entry fees are currently US$ 70 for adult non-East African Residents per 24 hours (if staying at a property inside the Reserve) or US$80 if outside the reserve, and $40 for children. There are a number of lodges and tented camps catering for tourists inside or bordering the Reserve and within the various separate Conservancies which border the main reserve. However, the main reserve is unfenced even along the border with Serengeti (Tanzania) which means there is free movement of wildlife throughout the ecosystem.

Although one third of the whole Maasai Mara in the western part of the larger reserve, The Mara Triangle has only two permanent lodges within its boundaries, namely the Mara Serena Lodge and Little Governors Camp (compared to the numerous camps and lodges on the Narok side) and has well maintained, all weather gravel roads. The rangers patrol regularly which means that there is less poaching and excellent game viewing. There is also strict control over vehicle numbers around animal sightings, allowing for a better experience when out on a game drive. Most lodges within the region charge higher rates during the Migration season, although the Maasai Mara is home to prolific wildlife year-round.

There are several airfields which serve the camps and lodges in the Maasai Mara, including Mara Serena Airstrip, Musiara Airstrip and Keekorok, Kichwa Tembo, Ngerende Airport, Ol Kiombo and Angama Mara Airstrips, and several airlines such as SafariLink and AirKenya fly scheduled services from Nairobi and elsewhere multiple times a day. Helicopter flights over the reserve are limited to a minimum height of 1,500 ft.

Game drives are the most popular activity in the Maasai Mara, but other activities include hot air ballooning, nature walks, photographic safaris and cultural experiences.

Big Cat Diary

The BBC Television show titled "Big Cat Diary" was filmed in the Maasai Mara. The show followed the lives of the big cats living in the reserve. The show highlighted scenes from the Reserve's Musiara marsh area and the Leopard Gorge, the Fig Tree Ridge areas and the Mara River, separating the Serengeti and the Maasai Mara.

Photography competition 
In 2018, the Angama Foundation, a non-profit affiliated with Angama Mara, one of the Mara's luxury safari camps, launched the Greatest Maasai Mara Photographer of the Year competition, showcasing the Mara as a year-round destination and raise funds for conservation initiatives active in the Mara. The inaugural winner was British photographer Anup Shah. The 2019 winner was Lee-Anne Robertson from South Africa.

Threats
A study funded by WWF and conducted by ILRI between 1989 and 2003 monitored hoofed species in the Mara on a monthly basis, and found that losses were as high as 75 percent for giraffes, 80 percent for common warthogs, 76 percent for hartebeest, and 67 percent for impala. The study blames the loss of animals on increased human settlement in and around the reserve. The higher human population density leads to an increased number of livestock grazing in the park and an increase in poaching. The article claims, "The study provides the most detailed evidence to date on the declines in the ungulate (hoofed animals) populations in the Mara and how this phenomenon is linked to the rapid expansion of human populations near the boundaries of the reserve."

The rise of local populations in areas neighbouring the reserve has led to the formation of conservation organisations such as the Mara Elephant Project who aim to ensure the peaceful and prosperous co-existence of humans alongside wildlife.  Human wildlife conflict is seen as a leading threat to the reserve as the population continues to grow.

See also
 Olare Orok Conservancy
List of national parks of Kenya

References

External links

The Mara Triangle

Protected areas of Kenya
Protected areas established in 1974
Narok County
Southern Acacia-Commiphora bushlands and thickets